Sunkari Kabba-Kamara (born May 29, 1969) is a Sierra Leonean politician and the current mayor of the city of Makeni.

Political career 
In surprising fashion, she defeated the incumbent Mayor of Makeni, Moses Musa Sesay, in a landslide victory in the APC primary election held on September 2, 2012 in Makeni.

She was victorious, winning 86.95% of the vote over her main opponent, Abu A. Koroma, of the Sierra Leone People's Party (SLPP) in the 2012 Makeni Mayoral election.

Personal life 
Sunkari Kabba-Kamara is a native of Bombali District in Northern Sierra Leone, and a member of the Mandingo ethnic group.

References

External links
awoko.org
news.sl

Sierra Leonean politicians
People from Makeni
1969 births
Living people